The Chad National Museum is the national museum of Chad. It is located in the capital city of N'Djamena, near Kempinski Hotel N'Djamena. The museum was established on October 6, 1962, in temporary quarters under the name of Chad National Museum, Fort-Lamy, reflecting the earlier, colonial name of Chad's capital. In 1964, it moved to the former town hall, near the Place de l'Indépendance.

At the time of the Chad National Museum's establishment, it had four rooms for prehistory, protohistory, archives, folk arts, crafts and traditions.

The prehistory room, at least in 1965, included items related to pebble culture, including material from the Amgamma cliff, Paleolithic implements, axes with helve-holes, nether millstones, and quartz and obsidian arrowheads. The museum at one time included a full-sized ochre reproduction of a hunting scene from the first millennium B.C. Its collection also included baked bricks, some attributed to Boulala and Babalia people. These items were discovered at the Bouta-Kabira sanctuary including human masks, bronze objects and bone tools.

Many of its artifacts have been lost due to the instability in the country. It has a notable collection of musical instruments.

See also
List of museums in Chad

References

Museums in Chad
National museums
Museums established in 1962
Buildings and structures in N'Djamena
1962 establishments in Chad